Holuhraun is a lava field just north of the Vatnajökull ice cap, in the Icelandic Highlands, in Suður-Þingeyjarsýsla, Northeastern Region, Iceland. The lava field was created by fissure eruptions. After a research expedition in 1880, the lava field was initially called Kvislarhraun . Four years later, it received its current name from geologist and geographer Þorvaldur Thoroddsen.

Geography
Holuhraun is situated at the southern end of Ódáðahraun , which is one of the largest lava fields in the country. The main volume of the Jökulsá á Fjöllum river flows from the eastern side of Holuhraun, in the Kverkfjöll area. Hrímalda , Urðarháls  and Kistufell  are to the west of Holuhraun, with Dyngjuháls  and Trölladyngja beyond. The Dyngjujökull glacier, which is part of Vatnajökull, is to the immediate south. Holuhraun is traversed by an unnumbered road, which connects to the Route F910 gravel road at both the east and the west ends.

Volcanism
Located at the northern and southern extensions of the Bárðarbunga and Askja fissure systems, respectively, the soil is mainly composed of lavas derived from these volcanoes, either in the form of flows or alluvial deposits of volcanic origin. The geological configuration, along with the presence of nearby subglacial volcanoes such as Bárðarbunga and Grímsvötn, is responsible for the risk of jökulhlaups, which have affected Holuhraun repeatedly.

Until 2014, the surface of the lava field was of an older lava flow, which had erupted from a vent associated with Askja in 1797. In the early hours of 29 August 2014, a small fissure eruption occurred in Holuhraun at the northern end of a magma intrusion which had moved progressively north, since 16 August, from the Bárðarbunga volcano. The progression of the magma intrusion was accompanied by an earthquake swarm. The eruption began just after midnight and stopped at 04:00 GMT.

Another fissure eruption started in Holuhraun at around 05:05 GMT on the morning of 31 August 2014, in the same rift as the eruption which had occurred two days earlier. Two new eruptive fissures formed south of the main eruption site, on 5 September. The new fissures were substantially smaller than the older fissure. By 7 September, the lava flow had extended  to the north, and had reached the main western branch of the Jökulsá á Fjöllum river. The eruption showed no visible activity in the southern fissure, on the evening of 7 September. The lava flow is considered to be the largest in recent decades in Iceland and covered  on 29 September. The volcanic eruption in Holuhraun continued with similar intensity as the previous few weeks. The lava field covered  in late October.

The eruption ended on 27 February 2015.

Several names were proposed for the new lava field in the Holuhraun area, among them Flæðahraun, Nornahraun, and Urðarbruni. Finally, the decision was to keep the existing name Holuhraun.

References

External links

Icelandic Meteorological Office page with latest updates on the Holuhraun eruption
3d map of volcanic activity in Holuhraun updated live from IMO

Bárðarbunga
Fissure vents
Highlands of Iceland
Lava fields